The 1986 Haringey Council election took place on 8 May 1986 to elect members of Haringey London Borough Council in London, England. The whole council was up for election and the Labour party retained overall control of the council.

Background

Election result

|}

Ward results

Alexandra

Archway

Bowes Park

Bruce Grove

Bryan Morris was a sitting councillor for Highgate ward.

Coleraine

Crouch End

Paul Loach was a sitting councillor for Seven Sisters ward.

Fortis Green

Green Lanes

Harringay

Sharon Lawrence was a sitting councillor for Alexandra ward.

High Cross

Robert Harris was a sitting councillor for Bruce Grove ward.

Highgate

Hornsey Central

Pearl Hurry was a sitting councillor for the Bowes Park ward. She, and Brian Bullard, were originally elected as Conservatives.

Hornsey Vale

Muswell Hill

Noel Park

Park

Seven Sisters

South Hornsey

South Tottenham

Viv Fenwick was a sitting councillor for Hornsey Vale ward.
Walter Taylor was a sitting councillor for West Green ward.

Tottenham Central

West Green

White Hart Lane

Woodside

References

1986
1986 London Borough council elections